Niklas Hagman (born December 5, 1979) is a Finnish former professional ice hockey forward. He was a third round pick of the Florida Panthers, 70th overall, at the 1999 NHL Entry Draft and made his National Hockey League (NHL) debut with Florida in 2001. He has also played for the Dallas Stars, Toronto Maple Leafs, Calgary Flames and Anaheim Ducks in the NHL, Lokomotiv Yaroslavl in the KHL, HIFK, Espoo Blues and Kärpät in the SM-liiga and HC Davos in the Swiss National League A.

An accomplished international player, Hagman has represented Finland at three Winter Olympic Games, winning a silver medal in 2006 and bronze at 2010. He played on the Finnish team that reached the final of the 2004 World Cup of Hockey, has appeared in five World Championships and twice played at the World Junior Championships, winning a gold medal in 1998.

Playing career

Professional

Finland
Hagman grew up playing with HIFK, appearing with their under-18 and junior teams between 1995 and 1999. He played his first professional games in 1997–98 with HIFK. He appeared in eight games in the SM-liiga, Finland's top league, and scored his first goal. He split the majority of the 1998–99 season between HIFK's senior and junior teams before he was sent to the Espoo Blues to complete the season.

While the Florida Panthers selected Hagman in the third round, 70th overall, at the 1999 NHL Entry Draft, he remained in Finland. He played with Kärpät of the Mestis, the Finnish second division, in 1999–00, and remained with the team for 2000–01 after they gained promotion to the SM-liiga. He led Kärpät with 28 goals that season and finished second on the team in points.

National Hockey League
Hagman left Finland to join the Panthers for the start of the 2001–02 season. He appeared in 78 games for Florida, scoring 10 goals and 28 points on the season.  He was named the NHL's Rookie of the Month for March 2002, and though he fell to 23 points in 2002–03, played in the YoungStars game at the 2003 NHL All-Star Game.

Following another 23-point campaign in 2003–04, Hagman signed with HC Davos of the Swiss National League A as the 2004–05 season was wiped out by a labour dispute.  He scored 40 points in 44 games, as Davos won the Swiss championship. He returned to the Panthers to begin the 2005–06 season, but after 30 games, he was traded to the Dallas Stars in exchange for a seventh-round selection at the 2007 NHL Entry Draft.

Hagman recorded his 100th career NHL point in a 2–1 victory over the Vancouver Canucks on October 23, 2006. He enjoyed his career best season in 2007–08, scoring 27 goals and 41 points. He led the Stars with eight game-winning goals and scored his first hat-trick on February 28, 2008, against the Chicago Blackhawks. An unrestricted free agent following the season, Hagman signed a four-year, US$12 million contract with the Toronto Maple Leafs.

Hagman reached numerous milestones en route to his second 20-goal campaign in 2008–09. He played his 500th NHL game on November 17, 2008, against the Boston Bruins, scored his 200th point on February 22, 2009, against the New York Rangers and his 100th goal on March 28, also against Boston.  He spent the majority of the 2009–10 season with the Leafs, and was their leading scorer with 20 goals when he was included in a major trade on January 31, 2010.

The Calgary Flames acquired Hagman, along with Jamal Mayers, Matt Stajan and Ian White, in exchange for Dion Phaneuf, Fredrik Sjöström and Keith Aulie. Hagman finished the season with 25 goals and 44 points split between Toronto and Calgary.

Hagman started the 2011–12 season with the Flames, but was a healthy scratch in six of the first 14 games, and scored only one goal and three assists in the eight games he played. The Flames placed Hagman on waivers and, when he cleared waivers on November 11, assigned him to the American Hockey League's Abbotsford Heat, the Flames' top minor league affiliate. The Flames then placed the winger on re-entry waivers to allow another team to pick him up for only half his salary. He was subsequently claimed by the Anaheim Ducks on November 14, 2011, with the Flames remaining responsible to pay the other half of his salary for the duration of his contract.

Europe
Following the 2011–12 season, Hagman returned to Europe, signing a deal with Lokomotiv Yaroslavl of the KHL. In the 2012–13 season for Yaroslavl, he played 49 games in the regular season, scoring 12 goals and providing eight assists. This was then followed by a six-game playoff run in which Hagman went scoreless.

In July 2013, the Finnish SM-liiga club Ässät announced that Hagman had signed for a one-year contract.

International play

Hagman first represented his country internationally as a member of the Finnish junior team at the 1998 World Junior Ice Hockey Championships.  The tournament was held in Helsinki, and though the Finns were not expected to be contenders, they ultimately won the gold medal.  Hagman scored the championship winning goal in overtime to defeat the Russians. He described winning the championship in his home country as being one of the greatest achievements of his career.  He again played with the Finnish junior team at the 1999 tournament, but the Finns were unable to duplicate their success, finishing fifth.

An injury to Ville Peltonen shortly before the 2002 Winter Olympics opened up a chance for Hagman to represent the Finnish senior team for the first time. He appeared in four games for the Finns, scoring one goal. Later that spring, he played his first of four consecutive World Championships.  He played in the 2004 World Cup of Hockey, scoring one goal in five games for Finland, who finished as the tournament runners-up to Canada.

Hagman made his second Olympic appearance at the 2006 Winter Games in Turin. He scored only one assist in eight games, but was part of a strong team defence that allowed only five goals in seven games as Finland found itself in the gold medal final against Sweden. The Finns lost the game, 3–2, and settled for the silver medal. It was a result Hagman found disappointing, especially in losing to Finland's arch-rivals in hockey.  Hagman played his third Olympics at the 2010 Vancouver Games.  Following a devastating 6–1 loss to the United States in the semi-final, Finland found itself trailing Slovakia by a 3–1 score entering the third period of the bronze medal game. Hagman sparked a four-goal outburst in the final period, scoring on the powerplay five minutes into the frame to bring the Finns within one goal before teammate Olli Jokinen scored both tying and winning goals.  For Hagman, the bronze represented his second Olympic medal.

Personal life 
Hagman's father Matti was the first Finnish player to play in the NHL, and they are the first Finnish father and son to have played in the League. His uncle is Kai Haaskivi, a retired professional football (soccer) player and former member of the Finnish national team and his cousin is the actor Olli Haaskivi. Hagman announced his engagement to Finnish model and first runner-up of Miss Finland 2003, Piritta Hannula, in Spring 2005. They were married on July 8, 2006, in Helsinki. They have a son named Lukas, born in February 2007. Their daughter Lila was born in September 2009. In March 2018 Niklas and Piritta Hagman filed a request for divorce. The divorce became legal in December same year.

Career statistics

Regular season and playoffs

International

See also
 Notable families in the NHL

References

External links

1979 births
Living people
Anaheim Ducks players
Ässät players
Calgary Flames players
Dallas Stars players
Espoo Blues players
Sportspeople from Espoo
Finnish ice hockey left wingers
Florida Panthers draft picks
Florida Panthers players
HC Fribourg-Gottéron players
HC Davos players
HIFK (ice hockey) players
HPK players
Ice hockey players at the 2002 Winter Olympics
Ice hockey players at the 2006 Winter Olympics
Ice hockey players at the 2010 Winter Olympics
Jokerit players
Lokomotiv Yaroslavl players
Medalists at the 2010 Winter Olympics
Medalists at the 2006 Winter Olympics
Oulun Kärpät players
Olympic bronze medalists for Finland
Olympic ice hockey players of Finland
Olympic silver medalists for Finland
Olympic medalists in ice hockey
Toronto Maple Leafs players